Complexo Educacional Campos Salles is a Brazilian private elementary and high school located in the city of São Paulo. In , the college Faculdades Integradas Campos Salles was founded as an extension to the school. Campos Salles has a scholarship program, offering scholarships for teenage sports players.

References

External links
Colégio Campos Salles' website

Private schools in Brazil